"Life Is Beautiful" is debut single by Los Angeles-based band Sixx:A.M., and lead single from their debut album, The Heroin Diaries Soundtrack. The song was written by Nikki Sixx, founding member of both Sixx:A.M. and Mötley Crüe. "Life Is Beautiful" quickly gained popularity and reached number two on the U.S. Hot Mainstream Rock Tracks chart and number 25 on the Hot Modern Rock Tracks chart. The song is available for download in the Rock Band video games and was used in the promotion of the 2008 horror film One Missed Call.

Song meaning
"Life Is Beautiful" is about Sixx's past drug addiction, the difficulties he encountered while addicted, and his realization that "Life Is Beautiful." Part of the chorus of the song, "Will you swear on your life, that no one will cry at my funeral", is a quote from Sixx's former roommate and co-lead guitarist from Ratt, Robbin Crosby. Years after being turned onto heroin by Sixx, Crosby died from AIDS from using a dirty needle to shoot up.

Music video
The music video for the song features band's performance with lyrics and rough hand illustrations scrawled across the screen. The drummer in the video is Bones Elias from the bands Heaven Below and Julien-K.

Track listing

Charts

References

2007 debut singles
Songs about drugs
Songs written by DJ Ashba
Songs written by Nikki Sixx
Songs written by James Michael
Sixx:A.M. songs
2007 songs
Eleven Seven Label Group singles